James Hynd Marshall (9 June 1890 – 1958) was a Scottish professional footballer who played as an inside left.

Career
Born in Peterhead and raised in West Lothian, Marshall began his senior career with Partick Thistle, signing for Bradford City in June 1914. He made 33 Football League appearances for the West Yorkshire club either side of World War I, scoring 12 goals; he also played in four FA Cup matches, without scoring. After turning out for Partick and Ayr United as a guest player (the Scottish Football League continued during the conflict), Marshall returned to Bradford but departed Valley Parade in September 1920 to join Oldham Athletic. Following three seasons at Boundary Park he had short spells at Bangor City in Wales, at Southport, Rotherham County and Lincoln City in England and at Queen of the South back in Scotland.

Sources

References

1890 births
1958 deaths
Date of death missing
Scottish footballers
Footballers from Aberdeenshire
People from Peterhead
Footballers from West Lothian
Partick Thistle F.C. players
Bradford City A.F.C. players
Oldham Athletic A.F.C. players
English Football League players
Scottish Football League players
Partick Thistle F.C. wartime guest players
Ayr United F.C. wartime guest players
Bangor City F.C. players
Southport F.C. players
Rotherham County F.C. players
Lincoln City F.C. players
Queen of the South F.C. players
Association football inside forwards